Kara-Oy is a village in the Osh Region of Kyrgyzstan. It is part of the Nookat District. Its population was 602 in 2021.

Nearby villages include Ak-Bulak and Kyrgyz-Ata.

References

Populated places in Osh Region